Riang is a Palaungic language of Burma and China. Speakers are culturally assimilated with the Karen, but are Palaung by ancestry and their language is unrelated. Riang Lang and Riang Lai (Yinchia) are sometimes considered distinct languages.

References

Shintani Tadahiko. 2014. The Riang language. Linguistic survey of Tay cultural area (LSTCA) no. 101. Tokyo: Research Institute for Languages and Cultures of Asia and Africa (ILCAA).

Languages of Myanmar
Palaungic languages
Languages of China